Nande Wielink (born 21 June 1998) is a Dutch football player who plays for ACV Assen.

Club career
He made his professional debut in the Eerste Divisie for FC Emmen on 14 October 2016 in a game against FC Eindhoven.

References

External links
 

1998 births
People from Hoogeveen
Living people
Dutch footballers
FC Emmen players
Eerste Divisie players
Derde Divisie players
Association football defenders
PEC Zwolle players
Asser Christelijke Voetbalvereniging players
Footballers from Drenthe